Ghost World or Ghostworld may refer to:

Art & literature 
 Ghost World, a trilogy of novels by Susan Price published from 1987 to 1993
 Ghostworld (novel), a 1993 novel by Simon R. Green
Ghost World (comics), a comics story by Daniel Clowes first published from 1993 to 1997

Film, theatre, and television 
 "Ghostworld", a season 6 episode of The Real Ghostbusters
 Ghost World, a 1993 stage play by James McLure
 Ghost World (film), a 2001 film by Terry Zwigoff, based on the graphic novel
 "Ghost World" (The Vampire Diaries), a 2011 episode of The Vampire Diaries

Music 
 "Ghostworld", a 1986 song by Models from Models' Media
 "Ghost World," a 2000 song by Aimee Mann from Bachelor No. 2 (influenced by Clowes' comic book story)
 Ghost World, a 2020 EP by Lauren Aquilina

See also

  or 
  or 
 Spirit world (disambiguation)